The Grady County Courthouse is a courthouse in Cairo, Grady County, Georgia. It was constructed in 1985 after the previous courthouse burned down in 1980. The building was designed by Jinright, Ryan and Lynn Architects in the Classical Revival architectural style.

References

County courthouses in Georgia (U.S. state)
Buildings and structures in Grady County, Georgia
1985 establishments in Georgia (U.S. state)
Government buildings completed in 1985